CA Paris may refer to:

CA Paris-Charenton
Court of Appeal of Paris